MacHack was a Macintosh software developers conference first held in 1986 in Ann Arbor, Michigan in partnership with the University of Michigan.  The conference was organized and operated by Expotech, Inc.  The final (18th) MacHack conference took place on June 19–21, 2003. In 2004 the conference was renamed ADHOC (The Advanced Developers Hands On Conference). 2005 was the last year of the ADHOC conference.

History 
The conference was atypical of computer conferences in many ways. Keynotes were generally delivered at midnight. The focus of the conference was less on attending sessions and more on developing "hacks": displays of programming, scripting, configuration, or other techie prowess.  Hacks were presented in a raucous Friday night show and recognized at a Saturday banquet.  The best-received hacks were those developed on-site during the three-day conference, and those that embodied both remarkable technical skill and utter impracticality. Hacks that were perceived as having some utility value were penalized.

Rather than being held in a vibrant or popular location, the first MacHacks were held in the Holidome in Ann Arbor, Michigan.  After a few years, the conference tried one year at what has become known as the MacHack from Hell.  Subsequent MacHacks were held in an indistinct Holiday Inn along the Southfield Freeway in Dearborn, Michigan, adjacent to a CompUSA, a Wendy's, a Chili's, and not much else.

One of the key events each year was Bash Apple, typically involving one or more brave souls from Apple taking feedback from the angry mob, sometimes for hours on end.  Jordan Mattson was one such Apple representative, engaging so regularly and earnestly that the phrase "It's all Jordan's fault" became a mantra of MacHack.

The MacHax Group held the First Annual MacHax Group Best Hack Contest at the second MacHack in 1987.  The Hack Show generally started at midnight, and ran as late as 5AM.  Prizes were awarded to many of the contestants, generally inexpensive and tangentially related to the name or nature of the hack.  Unbeknownst to most of the attendees, a key goal of prize selection was to see just how outrageous items could be and still have contestants being willing to take them home. During the Dearborn years, the official and beloved hardware store and key purveyor to the contest organizers was Duke's Hardware.  Winners were selected by ballot at lunch later that same day, and awards awarded at dinner.  The top prize was the coveted Victor-brand rat trap modified to say "A-trap".  A-trap is a reference to the Motorola 68000 A-trap exception mechanism which Apple used to great effect in the creation of Macintosh and provided the foundation for much of the hacking enjoyed by attendees.

MacHack's small, informal ethic, and on-site coding challenges have been carried on by a number of conferences; for example, the C4 conference was explicitly created as an attempt to fill the void left by the end of MacHack.

Conference mantras
 Sleep is for the weak and sickly
 Kill Dean's INITs
 It's all Jordan's fault
 Who makes the rules?
 MARKETING!!!
 72 Hours Caffeine and Code

Keynote notables
 Doug Clapp
 Scott Knaster
 Original Macintosh development team reunion: Andy Hertzfeld, Randy Wiggington, Daniel Kottke, Caroline Rose, Jef Raskin and Bill Atkinson - 2001 Scheduled to appear, but unable to attend: Guy 'Bud' Tribble, Bruce Horn
 John Warnock
 Cory Doctorow
 Eric Raymond - 2000 "open source sermon"
 Dave Winer
 Andy Ihnatko
 Steve Wozniak - 1997, 2001
 Rob Malda
 Tim O'Reilly
 Ken Arnold
 Jordan Hubbard
 Ted Nelson (who may still be speaking in the Savoy Room)

Notable hacks

Incomplete list of 1987 hacks 
 Animated Icon in Finder by Roy Leban
 HeapInit by Fritz Anderson
 SetPaths by Paul Snively
 The Best Hack Implemented in a Nonexistent Product by Darin Adler, Mitch Adler, Leonard Rosenthal, and Paul Snively.  It was written using HyperCard, at the time an unreleased product codenamed WildCard.
 Best Power Hack by Mother Nature and NASA.  A lightning strike unexpectedly launched three missiles.

1994 Best Hack
 5th place: Metwowerks New & Improved, an addition to Metrowerks Code Warrior development environment.
 4th place: Stargate arcade game emulation.
 3rd place: NewTablet, which turns a Newton into a mouse replacement for a Macintosh.
 2nd place: POArk, Pong Open Architecture; supports any number of players on different operating systems.
 1st place and winner of the coveted A-Trap award:  FEZ by Doug McKenna, demonstrates an advanced set of ZoomRect techniques.

1998 Best Hack
 6th place: Switcher 98
 5th place: Spotlight
 4th place: Phaseshift
 3rd place: 180 Years of Hack
 2nd place: OFPong
 1st place and winner of the coveted A-Trap award: asciiMac by Alexandra Ellwood and Miro Jurisic

1999 Best Hack
 5th place: PatchMaker by Paul Baxter.
 4th place: MacJive by Ned Holbrook and Jorg Brown.
 3rd place: Desktop Doubler by Ed Wynne.
 2nd place: Out of Context Menus by Eric Traut
 1st place and winner of the coveted A-Trap award:  Unfinder by Lisa Lippincott

Complete list of 1999's hacks and a conference report.

Incomplete list of 2000 hacks
 Doggie-Style Windows (best yoot hack)
 L33t like Jeff K (best OS X hack)
 EtherPEG
 Los Alamos Security
 Monitor Doubler
 Vertigo
 Dock Strip

Complete list of 2001 hacks

 99 Bottles Hack
 Airport Radar(tm)
 AntiLib
 APLocation
 Apple Turnover
 AquaShade
 AquaWriter
 asciishopsource
 Beeper
 BOFH
 Buzzy
 Carol Goodell's Hack 2001
 Cat Juggler
 CDaemon
 Chia Windows X
 Chris Page's Hacks
 Crrrhaack
 Crypt-Oh
 CSFinalHack Module
 D-Trash
 DarkWaver ƒ
 DFA Doubler
 Dr. Cheshire's PPPoE Server
 DSPanic
 Eudora Stat Server
 F1Hack
 FWMacsBug
 GeniusBar ƒ
 GhostFinder
 GrowBoxDock
 Hackable AirPort Network Seeker
 Heep Peeker ƒ
 HelloTree
 HFS-
 Hunter's Hacks
 iBook turbo switch
 ImageToHtml (transformed an image into an HTML table composed of 1x1 pixel cells)
 iTunes (HACKED)
 iTunes Dock Dance Plugin
 iTunes Remote
 iWake
 Juggler
 Kilroy
 King of Swing
 Light Sleeper
 Mac OS X Patching Docs
 MacCleo
 Max's MADLIB from Hell
 Mentat
 More Prefs 1.0 ƒ
 MrMacintosh
 musicPrompter
 Network Alias
 NotEnoughSecrets
 NQCYA
 OurHack
 PageFido
 Palm Finder 2
 PalmDock
 PaperMaker
 PhaseShiftX
 Pied Piper ƒ
 PigLatin Folder
 pixelZone
 Polyhedra
 Pro Mousing
 pseudoDoc
 Saton Vs. Little Red RidingHood
 Silly String
 Spear Britney
 SpellCompositor
 Talking Steve
 TECalc ƒ
 TEPeste ƒ
 TheWeakestLink
 Throbber
 TiVo(tm) for QuickTime TV(tm)
 Tricycle (Lego Mindstorm(tm))
 Unprotected Memory
 Useful Hack
 X-Menu 2.0

Complete list of 2002 hacks

 HaikuReporter
 DockDockGoose
 newstracker
 LCD Degauss
 ClassicEdge
 ACursor
 Carol Goodell Hack 2002
 Xydra 0.1
 TuXin
 Starbanger
 BreakoutLevelEditor
 SlowDown
 Clarus all over
 WatchCow
 Lightnin'
 Dude, You're Getting a DogCow
 VIMim
 iBacklight
 Mr Lo
 Dock&Roll
 Load Minimizer
 Billy Carnage 1.0
 OpenGirL
 Project Mayhem
 Alarm Clock
 The Cat's Meow
 somersault
 Oh What A Hack
 The Iron Hack
 penguin gear (pres)
 Dock Invaders
 AniMac
 MOOF through the ROOF
 Airport Security 2002
 Shard
 aurport extender blender
 lcdSTAT!
 Ye Olde Movie
 Metadata
 airmoof
 Utility Scoring Stye (pres)
 Little Brother
 Mike's Moof
 3DogCow
 VideoFinder (not on CD)
 Jini Network Technology
 iMovie Hack
 Mac Enforcer
 JITObjectiveC
 InformedChoiceChooserFacelft
 nocat
 mosaiHack
 JNib
 iMenu
 APPLE VIDEO SAVER
 SleepItemsX
 DogcowMenu
 IconHunter IV ƒ
 Depth Perception
 Claris Coaster
 RCX Remote Control
 FireStarter
 dukeshardware.com
 HandMatrix
 OldSchoolEdit

Complete list of 2003 hacks

 Editable SPOD
 Jet Lag
 Haunter
 Sparkie
 Unstoppable Progress: Causes a progress bar to be filled with water.
 Desktop Control Panel Extension
 Secret Life of Apple Logo
 Stinkin Badges
 SPOD was here
 EdgeWarp
 DADEL
 GUI Kablooie
 AirPong
 ClickAndAHalf
 warphack
 underthedesktop
 DecryptErrorMessage
 FishEyeMenus
 Antiqualc
 SetiMonitor
 X-MENu 2 Unexpected End of File
 WTA Death Watch
 wait
 CyberCat
 Interface UnBuilder
 QTJGrab
 Script Adventure
 MagicLocalizer
 GLCheat
 iPod Adventure
 Spinning Clock of Death
 Cocoa DocTour
 Desktop Control Panel Extension
 Size Doesn't Matter
 The Boot
 mountxml
 iTunes Control
 iTunes Location Launcher
 Gnomes
 SEV
 iAnalyseThis
 MoodRing
 Packetplay
 Packet the Magic Dragon
 spuds
 alCrashda
 iPodRip was built at MacHack but not demonstrated as a hack

Mostly Complete list of 2004 hacks

 BadBadThing
 EtherPEGCocoa - A program that showed any JPEG images coming across the network (even by other users) in a window. A screensaver version was also produced.
 EULB Extension Program - A program that simulates a 2004-era iBook logic board error that results in screen flashing on Macs that don't have that issue.
 ExposéHopper - Turn on Expose and jump from window to window with a little figure.
 FrodoFinder
 Magic 8 Ball
 MailToOnCrash
 MegaManEffect - Shows the mega man intro whenever you start an application
 Neko Returns
 NotTheSameOldTrash
 Rumor Mill
 Scroll Plate - Hold a paper plate with an up-pointing red or down-pointing green arrow on it in front of the webcam and your Mac will scroll in that direction.
 SmartMouth
 SpellingB
 Stupid Shell Tricks 2004 - A bunch of shell scripts that do fun things, like one that would open/close the CD tray on Macs in the next room in a choreography.
 Talkicity - An app that used various Talking Moose animations and ran a conversation between them in a window.
 Temporary Items
 Unsummarize - A service plugin that takes a piece of text and makes it longer, seemingly doing the reverse of the system's "summarize" service.

See also
 C4 (conference)

References

 MacAddict magazines
 The Institute (IEEE, Piscataway, New Jersey); Volume 18 number 6, September 1994; page 16, "After 5" column

External links
 Official Site note the ironic catchphrase
 Official FAQ last updated April 7, 2003
 180 Years of Hack P.D. Magnus' brilliant historical examination, circa 1998.
 Will Hack for Food! Coverage of MacHack from 1998 through 2005 from TidBITS

Apple Inc. software
Apple Inc. conferences